Tumcha Aamcha Same Asta is an Indian television Marathi language series aired on Star Pravah. It was produced by Shreyas Talpade and Deepti Talpade under the banner of Affluence Movies Pvt. Ltd.

Summary
Gauri belongs to a well to do family & Ishaan is a struggling actor. It is a story about Gauri-Ishaan who are extremely ambitious about their career & they cross each other's paths.

Cast
 Amruta Deshmukh as Gauri
 Stavan Shinde as Ishaan
 Kavita Lad as Gauri's mother
 Anand Ingale as Gauri's father
 Mandar Kulkarni / Nikhil Pradhan as Pranav
 Ashish Joshi as Shailu
 Prajakta Dighe as Ishaan's mother
 Shubhangi Joshi as Ishaan's grandmother
 Pushkar Shrotri

References

External links
 
 Tumcha Aamcha Same Asta at Disney+ Hotstar

Star Pravah original programming
Marathi-language television shows
2015 Indian television series debuts
2016 Indian television series endings